Jayanath Sandacan was a Sri Lankan cricketer. He was a right-handed batsman and right-arm medium-pace bowler who played for Panadura Sports Club.

Sandacan made a single first-class appearance for the team, during the 1998–99 season, against Colombo. From the tailend, he scored 30 runs in the first innings in which he batted, and 4 runs in the second, though this was not enough to prevent Panadura losing by an innings margin.

External links
Jayanath Sandacan at Cricket Archive 

Sri Lankan cricketers
Panadura Sports Club cricketers
Living people
Place of birth missing (living people)
Year of birth missing (living people)